Social Studies is a studio album by Loudon Wainwright III, released in 1999. The album comprises various topical and satirical songs, originally produced for National Public Radio and based upon then-current issues and events, such as the Tonya Harding scandal, the O. J. Simpson murder trial, the lead-up to Y2K, and controversies surrounding comments made by former Republican U.S. Senator Jesse Helms.

Regarding the album's topical nature, Wainwright notes: "It's something that no-one does anymore; write songs about current events. When I was young there were a lot of topical songwriters around; maybe folk music had more impact on culture back then. I see these songs as a kind of musical journalism. My father was a journalist, for Life magazine, and I've definitely inherited something of that approach."

Production
The album was written over a period of 15 years, with Wainwright composing on his Martin guitar. It was produced by Joe Boyd and John Wood. NPR declined to air several of the songs that eventually became part of the album's track listing.

Critical reception
Rolling Stone wrote that "the best political songs combine passionate commitment and analytic command, laced with streaks of black humor, as in prime Mekons or Gil Scott-Heron." The Guardian deemed Social Studies "largely an album about alienation, anonymous telephone sex, and a society that lives vicariously, either through the OJ soap opera, or by watching TV news."

The Boston Globe thought that the album "shines with the same wise-guy wit, but also with a kind-eyed empathy that gives even his goofiest songs a sage maturity and warm emotional resonance." The Independent opined that Wainwright "is as wry and acid as ever, but most tracks should probably have remained one-off live broadcasts, as intended."

Track listing
All tracks composed by Loudon Wainwright III

"What Gives"  – 3:29
"Tonya's Twirls"  – 3:37
"New Street People"  – 2:50
"Carmine Street"  – 2:57
"O.J."  – 3:13
"Leap Of Faith"  – 2:53
"Conspiracies"  – 2:17
"Christmas Morning"  – 3:36
"Y2K"  – 6:13
"Number One"  – 3:39
"Bad Man"  – 3:21
"Inaugural Blues"  – 3:19
"Our Boy Bill"  – 3:11
"Jesse Don't Like It"  – 4:06
"Pretty Good Day"  – 4:19

Personnel
 Loudon Wainwright III - guitar, vocals
The Roches - vocals
John Scofield - electric guitar
Greg Cohen - bass, piano
Richard Crooks - drums, percussion
Peter Ecklund - trumpet, cornet
David Mansfield - guitar, harmonica, violin, mandolin
Jenni Muldaur - vocals
Ken Pearson - organ, piano
Lenny Pickett - clarinet, saxophone
Chaim Tannenbaum - banjo, harmonica, vocals

Release history
CD: Hannibal HNCD 1442

References

Loudon Wainwright III albums
1999 albums
Albums produced by Joe Boyd
Albums produced by John Wood (record producer)
Hannibal Records albums